Robert Cameron (1825 – 13 February 1913) was a Liberal Party politician in the United Kingdom.

Before he took office, he was a schoolmaster.

At the 1895 general election, he was elected as Member of Parliament (MP) for Houghton-le-Spring in County Durham, and held the seat until he died in office in 1913, at age 87.

See also

References

External links 
 

1825 births
1913 deaths
Liberal Party (UK) MPs for English constituencies
UK MPs 1895–1900
UK MPs 1900–1906
UK MPs 1906–1910
UK MPs 1910
UK MPs 1910–1918